Marlykovo is a rural locality (a village) in Nikolskoye Rural Settlement, Kaduysky District, Vologda Oblast, Russia. The population was 25 as of 2002.

Geography 
Marlykovo is located 24 km northeast of Kaduy (the district's administrative centre) by road. Krutets is the nearest rural locality.

References 

Rural localities in Kaduysky District